Peter Olai Thorvik  (2 July 1873 – 16 August 1965) was a Norwegian blacksmith, fisherman, banker and politician.

He was born in Volda to Sivert Peter Andersen Thorvik and Berthe Johanne Olsdatter Brune. He was elected representative to the Storting for several periods, 1922–1945, for the Labour Party.

References

1873 births
1965 deaths
People from Volda
Labour Party (Norway) politicians
Members of the Storting